Dysoxylum densiflorum is a tree in the family Meliaceae. The specific epithet  is from the Latin meaning "dense flowers".

Description
The bark is grey-green. The sweetly scented flowers are white.

Distribution and habitat
Dysoxylum densiflorum is found in Burma, southern China, Thailand, Malaysia and Indonesia. Its habitat is rain forest from sea-level to  altitude.

References

densiflorum
Trees of Myanmar
Trees of China
Flora of Yunnan
Trees of Malesia
Plants described in 1825
Taxa named by Friedrich Anton Wilhelm Miquel